Lord North (1732–1792) was Prime Minister of Great Britain from 1770 to 1782.

Lord North may also refer to:

Baron North, an abeyant title in the Peerage of England whose male holders were referred to as Lord North
Edward North, 1st Baron North (c. 1496–1564), lawyer, clerk in the House of Lords, and Privy Councillor
Roger North, 2nd Baron North (1530–1600), Treasurer of the Household for Elizabeth I
Dudley North, 3rd Baron North (1581–1666), politician, and one of few Lords who supported the Parliamentarians in the Civil War
Dudley North, 4th Baron North (1602–1677), Member of Parliament for Cambridgeshire in Short, Long, and Convention Parliaments
William North, 6th Baron North, 2nd Baron Grey (c. 1673–1734), soldier and Jacobite exile who fought for Spain
Francis North, 1st Earl of Guilford, 7th Baron North (1704–1790), politician and Queen Charlotte's treasurer
George North, 3rd Earl of Guilford, 9th Baron North (1757–1802) (abeyant 1802), son of the prime minister and politician
Lord North Street, a street in Westminster, London
Lord North Street, a London wealth management firm that merged to form Sandaire Investment Office in 2014
 Lord North (horse) (born 2016), winner of the 2020 Prince of Wales's Stakes

See also
 Earl of Guilford
 Lord North's Conciliatory Proposition